CBM may refer to:

Businesses and corporations
 Cambrex Corporation (NYSE: CBM)
 CBM (AM), a radio station in Montreal now known as CBME-FM
 CBM-FM, a radio station in Montreal
 CBM TV, a scrapped Freeview channel
 Central Bank of Myanmar
 Chesapeake Bay Magazine, a monthly publication focusing on boating, leisure, and lifestyle in the mid-Atlantic region
 Christian Blind Mission, a charity working to help people with disabilities
 Commodore International, originally "Commodore Business Machines, Inc." (CBM)
 Congo-Balolo Mission (CBM), was a British Baptist missionary society that was active in the Belgian Congo.
 Department of Commerce and Business Management, Guru Nanak Dev University
 Mesoamerican Biological Corridor, a multinational agreement and project for the conservation of biodiversity

Science and technology
 Bromochloromethane, a halomethane
 Captive bubble method, an instrumental surface analysis
 Carbohydrate-binding module
 Ceramic building material, an umbrella term used in archaeology to refer to all building materials made from baked clay
 Coalbed methane a form of CMM, coal mine methane
 Cognitive bias modification, a set of procedures used in psychology that aim to change biases in cognitive processes
 Common berthing mechanism, a structure in the International Space Station
 Computer-Based Math, a math education reform movement
 Condition-based maintenance, maintenance when needed
 Condition based monitoring, see Condition monitoring (CM)
 Conduction Band Minimum, lowest energy of the electrons in the conduction band of a (semiconducting) solid, see band gap
 Cosmic microwave background, "relic radiation" from the Big Bang

Other
 Canadian Baptist Mission
 Cannabis Based Medicine, see Medical cannabis
 Certified Broadcast Meteorologist, an American Meteorological Society certification
 Certified Business Manager
 College of Business Management, one of the constituent colleges of the Institute of Business Management in Karachi, Pakistan
 Comic book movie, a film based on comics
 Community-based monitoring, a form of public oversight
 Community beat manager, a police officer in the Lancashire Constabulary who is responsible for a particular ward area of a town
 Component business model
 Confidence-building measures
 Contra body movement in ballroom dancing
 Covered business method patent
 Curriculum-based measurement, an assessment method to track student progress in basic skills (i.e., reading, writing, and arithmetic) 
 Cubic metre, a unit of volume, commonly used in international shipping
 Columbus Air Force Base, which has the IATA and FAA LID CBM